Zaforas is a small Greek island in the southern part of the Dodecanese chain, about  south of the island Astypalaia.

Islands of Greece
Dodecanese
Landforms of Kalymnos (regional unit)
Islands of the South Aegean